1 Serpentis (1 Ser) is a red giant in the constellation Virgo with an apparent magnitude of 5.5.  It is a red clump giant, a cool horizontal branch star that is fusing helium in its core.  It has expanded to over 13 times the radius of the Sun and although it is cooler at  it is 77 times more luminous.  It is 322 light years away.

The Flamsteed designation 1 Serpentis was given to the star when the constellation Serpens was combined with the constellation Ophiuchus.  It was also given the Bayer designation M Serpentis.  When Ophiuchus and Serpens were separated into distinct constellations, 1 Serpentis was left over the border in Libra.  Since then it has moved slightly and is now in Virgo.

It has a spectral type of G5 IV, and it is slightly smaller and less luminous than the sun.

A much more widely-separated 10th-magnitude star is also listed in multiple star catalogues, but it is an unrelated background object.

References

Virgo (constellation)
K-type giants
Serpentis, 01
5573
132132
073193
Durchmusterung objects
3881
Serpentis, M
Binary stars
G-type subgiants